Nebulon is a fictional character appearing in American comic books published by Marvel Comics.

Fictional character biography
He was one of a number of Ul'lula'ns dispatched to locate and secure worlds with the mineral resources that they had depleted on their own home-world of Ul'ula in the Ul system, in the Milky Way galaxy. He took on a glistening, golden humanoid form in an attempt to blend with Earth's human population. Happening upon the evil Hyperion of the Squadron Sinister who was trapped in space, Nebulon rescued him. Hyperion led the alien back to Earth to let him have it. Nebulon helped Hyperion gather the other Squadron Sinister members to build a laser cannon that would melt the polar ice caps and flood the planet, making it perfectly suitable to the Ul'lula'ns.

Nighthawk, a former Squadron Sinister member, had been coerced into helping with this plan.  He contacted the Defenders, who traveled to the North Pole and fought the Squadron Sinister. During the course of the battle, Nebulon expended so much energy that he lost control of his humanoid form and reverted to his monstrous form; Nighthawk took advantage of the confusion this caused among Nebulon's allies and turned the laser cannon on Nebulon, causing him to seemingly implode.

In reality, Nebulon retreated to another dimension called Zaar, inhabited by the Ludberdites.  Nebulon adopted their philosophy of improving the lives of "lesser" beings, and returned to Earth to save its people from themselves. In the guise of "Mr. Nebul," he started a movement called Celestial Mind Control which promised to liberate the powers of the human mind, but actually robbed people of their free will. Nebulon recruited the Porcupine, the original Eel, and a Plantman simulacrum as his agents. The Defenders became aware of this movement and tried to stop him. However, he exiled the Defenders to another dimension.  At the same time as Nebulon's movement, the Headmen were attempting a similar movement. Nebulon engaged in battle with the Defenders and the Headmen. When the Defenders exposed the Headmen's political machinations, they managed to convince Nebulon of the futility of his goal, and Doctor Strange persuaded him to leave Earth.

When the Ul'lula'n government learned of Nebulon's activities, it tried and convicted him for treason. Nebulon escaped into Earth's ocean and took the form of the deceased Lady Dorma. He convinced the Atlanteans that she had survived, and used her popularity to convince them to attack London. The Defenders uncovered his latest deception. Soon afterward, an Ul'lula'n ship appeared and took custody of Nebulon. The authorities stripped much of his power from him, fixing him in his humanoid form, and exiling him on Earth. He was ordered to do the honorable thing and commit suicide, but refused. Nebulon's wife, Supernalia, learned of his dishonor and traveled to Earth to convince him to do the right thing. Nebulon was planning to use his technology to siphon power from the Avengers and restore his powers. Supernalia enlisted the aid of the Defenders, and the Defenders and Avengers were manipulated into fighting each other on the behalf of the two Ul'lula'ns. Supernalia realized that her own actions were a violation of her people's ethics, and threw herself into the energy-draining ray; Nebulon tried to save her but fell into the ray himself. As Nebulon died from the bombardment by the energy-draining Ennui-ray, he believed he was finally acting honorably. The Avengers and Defenders buried the two aliens where they died, in the snow of the Himalayan Mountains.

Powers and abilities
Nebulon's powers are a result of biospheric energy and his alien physiology. He has superhuman strength, durability, and reflexes. Nebulon had the ability to manipulate energy for a variety of effects, including the creation of spheres, shields, or energy bolts, teleportation across the surface of a planet and between dimensions, and shape-shifting. Nebulon's powers were dependent on the biospheric energy of planets. If he were deprived of contact with a planetary biosphere long enough, his power level would be reduced to that of a normal human being.

Nebulon possessed a gifted intellect and has extensive knowledge of existential philosophy.

References

External links

http://en.marveldatabase.com/Nebulon_%28Earth-616%29

Characters created by Len Wein
Characters created by Sal Buscema
Comics characters introduced in 1974
Marvel Comics aliens
Marvel Comics supervillains